The Girls on the Bus is an upcoming American political drama television series which is set to premiere in 2023 on HBO Max. The Girls on the Bus is produced by Berlanti Television, My So Called Company, and Warner Bros. Television Studios.

Premise
The Girls on the Bus chronicles 4 female journalists who follow every move of a parade of flawed presidential candidates, while finding friendship, love, and scandal along the way.

Cast

Main
 Melissa Benoist as Sadie McCarthy
 Natasha Behnam as Lola
 Christina Elmore as Kimberlyn
 Brandon Scott
 Carla Gugino as Grace

Recurring
 Scott Foley
 Griffin Dunne as Bruce Turner
 Leslie Fray as Nellie Carmichael
 PJ Sosko as Hunter S. Thompson
 Becky Ann Baker as Norah McCarthy
 Kyle Vincent Terry as Eric Jordan
 Tala Ashe
 Richard Bekins
 Mark Consuelos

Production
The series first began development in August 2019 at Netflix, which is inspired by the novel Chasing Hilary by Amy Chozick, who developed the series with Julie Plec. However, by September 2021, Netflix dropped the series, which would move over to The CW and receiving a rework by Chozick and Plec. The series would again change networks in February 2022 to HBO Max, where it was issued a series order. Melissa Benoist would enter negotiations to star in the series that same month as well as serve as a producer. In June, Rina Mimoun joined the series to serve as showrunner, while Benoist would be confirmed to participate in the series and Natasha Behnam was cast. In July, Christina Elmore joined the cast. The following month, Brandon Scott was added to the main cast, while Scott Foley and Griffin Dunne were among several additions to the recurring cast. CNN anchor Abby Phillip would also join the production to serve as a consultant. In September, Carla Gugino would join in a lead role, and Mark Consuelos would join in a recurring role in October.

Production on the series had begun by October 1, 2022, when Chozick announced on Instagram that filming had wrapped on the pilot episode.

References

External links
 

HBO Max original programming
English-language television shows
Television series about sisters
Television series by Warner Bros. Television Studios